The limited liability limited partnership (LLLP) is a relatively new modification of the limited partnership. The LLLP form of business entity is recognized under United States commercial law. An LLLP is a limited partnership, and it consists of one or more general partners who are liable for the obligations of the entity, as well as or more protected-liability limited partners. Typically, general partners manage the LLLP, while the limited partners' interest is purely financial. Thus, the most common use of limited partnership is for purposes of investment.

LLLP versus LP
In a traditional limited partnership the general partners are jointly and severally liable for its debts and obligations. Limited partners are not liable for those debts and obligations beyond the amount of their capital contributions.

An LLLP allows liability for debts and obligations of the limited partnership to be transferred from the general partners to an external insurer, something that is not possible with a traditional LLP. By having the limited partnership make an election under state law, the general partners are afforded limited liability for the debts and obligations of the limited partnership that arise during the period that the LLLP election is in place. The manner of election varies in accord with state law. For example, in Delaware LLLP elections take the form of a limited partnership electing to be a limited liability partnership (this is the format used in Delaware, while in Florida, Hawaii and Kentucky the election is made in the certificate of limited partnership.

Not all states presently allow business entities to form as LLLPs. Most states that recognize LLLPs require that an entity identify itself as an LLLP in its name, but that requirement is not universal. LLLPs are most common in the real estate business, although other businesses can also use the form, for example, CNN. Questions remain about whether the limited liability provided to general partners by the LLLP election will be effective in states that do not have an LLLP statute.

States with LLLP enabling statutes
The following states have statutes that enable LLLPs.
 Alabama
 Alaska
 Arizona
 Arkansas
 Colorado
 Delaware
 District of Columbia
 Florida 
 Georgia
 Hawaii
 Idaho
 Indiana
 Iowa
 Kentucky
 Maryland
 Minnesota
 Missouri
 Montana
 Nevada
 New Mexico
 North Carolina
 North Dakota
 Ohio
 Oklahoma
 Pennsylvania 
 South Dakota
 Tennessee
 Texas
 Utah
 Virginia
 Washington
 Wyoming
 US Virgin Islands

Though California does not have a state statute allowing formation of an LLLP, it does recognize LLLPs formed under the laws of another state. While registering an LLLP formed in another state in California will trigger the same annual franchise tax applicable to entities formed California. The statute governing whether an LLLP must register is less inclusive than the statute for out-of-state LLCs.

Illinois, though not having an enabling statute, does allow formation of an LLLP under RULPA (Revised Uniform Limited Partnership Act).

References

United States business law
Types of business entity
Legal entities